Mauro Crenna (born 2 November 1991) is an Italian canoeist. He competed in the men's K-2 200 metres event at the 2016 Summer Olympics.

References

External links
 

1991 births
Living people
Italian male canoeists
Olympic canoeists of Italy
Canoeists at the 2016 Summer Olympics
Place of birth missing (living people)
Mediterranean Games silver medalists for Italy
Mediterranean Games bronze medalists for Italy
Mediterranean Games medalists in canoeing
Competitors at the 2013 Mediterranean Games
20th-century Italian people
21st-century Italian people